Waterboard may refer to:

 Water board, an organisation charged with the supply of water and care of water levels
 Waterboarding, a form of torture consisting of immobilizing the victim and pouring water over the face and into the breathing passages
 Water cure, a form of torture in which the victim is forced to drink large quantities of water in a short time
 Surfboard, a narrow plank used in surfing